Institutional Web Management Workshop (IWMW) is a series of workshop events which was originally organised by UKOLN to provide professional development for web managers, policy makers, developers, designers and information professionals related  to the UK's higher education community. Following cessation of JISC's core funding for UKOLN, since 2014 the event has been organised by UK Web Focus.

The event aims to provide an opportunity for discussion and debate amongst the participants. A number of plenary talks address key areas of interest. However the main focus of the workshop centres on the parallel sessions, discussion groups and debates which enable participants to be actively engaged with the issues facing those involved in the provision of institutional Web management services.

The workshop series began with a two-day event held at King's College London on 16 –17 July 1997.  Following the success of the initial event, in 1998 the event was extended to a 3-day format, although in 2011, due to the economic climate, the event reverted to a 2-day format but returned to a 3-day format the following year.

Noteworthy Incident at IWMW 2005
The IWMW 2005 event was the first time a WiFi network was available for use by the participants. As described in a paper on "Using Networked Technologies To Support Conferences" 

this was an early example of an "amplified conference" with the provision of a number of networked technologies  being used to support the event. The 7 July 2005 London bombings took place midway through the event. Participants who were making use of the network were first alerted to the news on the event's IRC channel, and a  record of the discussions when the participants first became aware of the significance of this news is available.

Full List Of IWMW Events

Feedback on the Event
Reports on IWMW events written by event delegates have been published for
IWMW 2003,
IWMW 2004,
IWMW 2005,  
IWMW 2006,
IWMW 2007,
IWMW 2008,  
IWMW 2009,
IWMW 2010 
and IWMW 2012.

References

Information technology organisations based in the United Kingdom
Web-related conferences